This is a list of Portuguese painters.

A
Jorge Afonso (c. 1470 – 1540)
Nadir Afonso (1920–2013); see also Nadir Afonso artworks
Almada Negreiros, José de: see under Negreiros: José de Almada Negreiros (1893–1970)
Francisco Keil do Amaral, (1910–1975)
Lino António (1898–1974)

B
Armando de Basto (1889–1923)
Pedro Boese (born 1972)
Carlos Botelho (1899–1982)
Manuel Botelho (born 1950)

C
Pedro Calapez (born 1953)
Nuno de Campos (born 1969)
Amadeo de Souza Cardoso (1887–1918)
Manuel Carmo (1958–2015)
António Carneiro (1872–1930)
Manuel Casimiro (born 1941)
Cesariny de Vasconcelos, Mário: see under Vasconcelos: Mário Cesariny de Vasconcelos (1923–2006)
Coelho, José Dias: see under Dias: José Dias Coelho (1923–1961)
Domingos da Cunha, O Cabrinha (1598–1644)
José da Cunha Taborda (1766–1836)

D
António Dacosta (1914–1990)
José Dias Coelho (1923–1961)
Juno Doran (born 1966)

E
Mário Eloy (1900–1951)

F
Garcia Fernandes (died c. 1565)
Vasco Fernandes (c. 1475 – c. 1542)
Cristóvão de Figueiredo (died c. 1540)
António Manuel da Fonseca (1796–1890)
Fonseca, Maria Inês Ribeiro da: see under Ribeiro: Maria Inês Ribeiro da Fonseca (1926–1995)

G
Luis Geraldes (born 1957)
André Gonçalves (1685–1754)
Nuno Gonçalves (15th century, second half)
Gouveia, Ricardo: see under Rigo 23 (born 1966)

H
Francisco Henriques (died 1518)
João Navarro Hogan (1914–1988)
Francisco de Holanda (c. 1517 – 1585)

J
 Manuel Jardim (1884–1923)

K
Alfredo Keil (1850–1907)
Keil do Amaral, Francisco: see under Amaral: Francisco Keil do Amaral (1910–1975)

L
Fernando Lanhas (1923–2012)
Cristóvão Lopes (c. 1516 – 1594)
Gregório Lopes (c. 1490 – 1550)
Cristobal López (died 1594)

M
José Malhoa (1855–1933)
Abel Manta (1888–1982)
João Abel Manta (born 1928)
João Marques de Oliveira (1853–1927)
Matos, Francisco Vieira de: see Vieira Portuense (1765–1805)
Henrique Medina (1901–1988)
Albuquerque Mendes (born 1953)
Francisco Augusto Metrass (1825–1861)

N
José de Almada Negreiros (1893–1970)
Sá Nogueira (1921–2002)

O
Josefa de Óbidos (1630–1684)
Oliveira, João Marques: see under Marques: João Marques de Oliveira (1853–1927)

P
António Palolo (1946–2000)
Columbano Bordalo Pinheiro (1857–1929)
Júlio Pomar (1926–2018)
Porto, António Carvalho de Silva: see under Silva Porto: António Carvalho de Silva Porto (1850–1893)
Henrique Pousão (1859–1884)

R
Paula Rego (1935–2022)
Pedro Cabrita Reis (born 1956)
Maria Inês Ribeiro da Fonseca, (Menez) (1926–1995)
Rigo 23 (born 1966 as Ricardo Gouveia)
José Rodrigues (1828–1887)

S
Abel Salazar (1889–1946)
Julião Sarmento (1948–2021)
Domingos Sequeira (1768–1837)
Silva, Maria Helena Vieira da: see under Vieira da Silva: Maria Helena Vieira da Silva (1908–1992)
António Carvalho de Silva Porto (1850–1893)
João Cristino da Silva (1829–1877) 
Adriano Sousa Lopes (1879–1944)
Amadeo de Souza Cardoso (1887–1918)
Aurélia de Souza (1867–1922)
Sofia Martins de Sousa (1870–1960)

V
Mário Cesariny de Vasconcelos (1923–2006)
Francisco Venegas (fl. 1578–1590)
Marcelino Vespeira (1925–2002)
Eduardo Viana (1881–1967)
Maria Helena Vieira da Silva (1908–1992)
Manuel Vilarinho (born 1953)

X
Xesko (born 1962)

See also
Culture of Portugal

Portuguese
 
Painters